LGA 1366 (land grid array 1366), also known as Socket B, is an Intel CPU socket. This socket supersedes Intel's LGA 775 (Socket T) in the high-end and performance desktop segments. It also replaces the server-oriented LGA 771 (Socket J) in the entry level and is superseded itself by LGA 2011. This socket has 1,366 protruding pins which touch contact points on the underside of the processor (CPU) and accesses up to three channels of DDR3 memory via the processor's internal memory controller.

Socket 1366 (Socket B) uses Intel QuickPath Interconnect (QPI) to connect the CPU to a reduced-function northbridge that serves mainly as a PCI-Express controller. A slower DMI is used to connect Intel's most recent northbridge and southbridge components. By comparison, Intel's LGA 1156 (Socket H) moves the QPI link and PCI-Express controller onto the processor itself, using DMI to interface a single-component "chipset" (now called PCH) that serves traditional southbridge functions. The difference in pin number is mostly a reflection of the number of memory channels served.

In November 2008, Intel released Core i7, which was the first processor requiring this socket.

LGA 1366 socket and processors were discontinued sometime in early 2012, having been superseded by the LGA 2011 and LGA 1356 socket, on 14 November 2011, supporting Sandy Bridge E-series processors. The accompanying LGA 1156 was discontinued at the same time, which was replaced by LGA 1155.

Socket B mechanical load limits 
Socket B processors have the following mechanical maximum load limits which should not be exceeded during heatsink assembly, shipping conditions, or standard use. Load above those limits will crack the processor die and make it unusable.

Processors using this socket have a lower static load limit than previous models using LGA 775. Available reference heat sinks include circular design and heatpipe design.

Supported chipsets 
The chipsets that support LGA 1366 are Intel's X58 (desktop) and 3400, 3420, 3450, 5500, 5520 and 7500 (server).

See also 
 List of Intel microprocessors
 List of Intel Core i7 microprocessors
 List of Intel Xeon microprocessors
 List of Intel Celeron microprocessors
 CPU socket
 Nehalem (microarchitecture)
 LGA 1156
 LGA 1155
 LGA 2011

References

Intel CPU sockets